This article lists the episodes from the television series Friday Download.

Series overview

Episode list

Series 1 (2011)

Christmas Download (2011)

Series 2 (2012)

Series 3 (2012)

Series 4 (2012)

Series 5 (2013)
The fifth series saw the departure of Tyger Drew-Honey and Georgia Lock, with former guest presenters Shannon Flynn and Daniel Pearson replacing them.

Series 6 (2013)
The sixth series began on Friday 20 September 2013 and was the first series to feature George Sear as a full-time presenter, replacing former presenter Danny Pearson.

Series 7 (2014)
The seventh series began on 16 May 2014 and is now being produced at The London Studios. Davis has departed from the show, heralding the end of Dance Download. Richard Wisker remains on the presenting team.  Guest presenters this series include The Vamps, Harvey, Anais Gallagher, Tinchy Stryder and Austin Mahone.

Series 8 (2014)

Series 8 returned on Saturday 4 October on CBBC and will include 11 episodes. Due to Dionne's departure, guest presenters will be replacing her with another as a 6th presenter. The main presenting team is Shannon Flynn, George Sear, Ceallach Spellman and Richard Wisker. Dionne departing replaces her with guest presenters who will present music download and sing download. Dionne will make an appearance in the series including the Radio 1 Teen Awards. Guest presenters this season include Molly Rainford, Anaïs Gallagher, Akai Osei, Harvey Cantwell, Jordan Brown, Julie Rogers, Kedar Williams-Sterling and Bars & Melody. Akai Osei joining the team includes the reappearance of Dance Download. Richard Wisker also misses a few episodes due to unknown reasons. The final episode of the series is a Christmas download special.

Series 9 (2015)
A new series of Friday Download was confirmed on the CBBC Website to start on 24 April 2015, which will consist of 15 30 minute episodes. The new presenting team includes former stand-in presenters: Molly Rainford, Anaïs Gallagher, Harvey Cantwell, Akai Osei, Leondre Devries and Charlie Lenehan. New things for this series include listicles and all the presenters singing at the end of each show plus the will also go round to each other's house's to do cool things. The series finished on 31 July 2015.

Notes

References

External links
 
 

Lists of British non-fiction television series episodes